An automated pipetting system is generally a device which performs programmed transfers of liquid between preselected groups of containers.

The word "pipetting" is referring to the laboratory manual tool called pipette, which is commonly used in molecular biology, analytical chemistry, and medical tests, to transport a measured volume of liquid. Moreover, its performances are regulated by the International Standard ISO8655-1:2002.

Automated pipetting systems are also commonly known as Liquid Handling Robots; nevertheless the latter definition is preferred whenever add-on modules are present (e.g. laboratory shaker), while the former typically focuses on liquid transfer property.
One of main advantages of these devices is the ability to enhance the reproducibility and the throughput of laboratory experiments.

Components
The vast majority of automated pipetting systems have the following 'structural' components:
 pipetting head
 user interface
 working area
 waste

Pipetting head 

The pipetting head is the mechanical component designed for liquid transfer. The majority of pipetting heads are based on a peristaltic pump system, while some anthropomorphic systems directly use manual pipettes.
A pipetting head can be multi-channel or single-channel: while the former has higher throughput, the latter has greater flexibility and reproducibility.
For accurate placement into the source and destination containers, the pipetting head is placed on an automated axis system, typically based on servo motors or stepper motors.

User interface 
The user interface  allows communication between the user and the system via a PC or a touchscreen. The most advanced user interfaces let users design their own experiments which are to be carried out on the system.

Working area 
The working area is the zone where liquid dispensing takes place, and it is the area where the pipetting head can move.
It contains holders that both hold the containers in which liquids are stored, and also allow the recognition of the position of the source and destination containers. The recognition of their position can be made 'statically' (off-line calibration of the position) or 'dynamically' (e.g. vision-controlled spatial localization).

Waste 
The waste container is a special container which stores disposable tips used by the system. It may also be used to throw away excess of liquid or washing buffer.

Functionality

An automated pipetting system obtains a volume of liquid from a source by creating suction, or aspirating, and dispensing this liquid over the destination container. This is achieved by the pipetting head installed on the system.

Liquids are not in direct contact with the pipetting head, but they are held by a structure called the tip. Tips can be permanent structures or disposable conical pieces. Disposable tips, in general made from injection molded plastic (typically polypropylene), have the advantage of being discarded between liquid transfers thus removing any chance of cross contamination. The choice of the most suitable tip mainly depends on the dispensing volume set on the pipetting head. 
Some tips are equipped with filter to prevent aerosol entering the pipette, which can be a source of contamination or cause of deterioration of the pipette.

Critical parameters 
There are some critical parameters which affect liquid transfer in automated pipetting system; the most common are listed below : 
 accuracy or systematic error, difference between the dispensed volume and the selected volume.
 repeatability or random error, scatter of the dispensed volumes around the mean of the dispensed volumes.
 CV (coefficient of variation), which is a normalized measure of dispersion of a probability distribution.
 speed of the system in performing liquid transfer.
 volume range:  currently the majority of devices operate in the microliter to milliliter range.

Curiosity 
The first manual pipette was patented in 1950s by G.S. Riggs and the first automated analyzing apparatus less than ten years after.

References

See also
Liquid Handling Robot
 Rubber bulb

Molecular biology laboratory equipment